Megachile tucumana is a species of bee in the family Megachilidae. It was described by Vachal in 1908.

References

Tucumana
Insects described in 1908